The following is an outline of topics related to the British Overseas Territory of the Bermuda Islands.

Bermuda
 Bermuda
 Bermuda Police Service
 Bermuda Triangle
 Bermudian architecture
 Demographics of Bermuda
 Charles Elliot
 Flag of Bermuda
 HMS Bermuda
 Hail to Bermuda
ISO 3166-1 alpha-2 country code for Bermuda: BM
ISO 3166-1 alpha-3 country code for Bermuda: BMU
 Jamestown, Virginia
 Johnny Barnes
 Law of Bermuda
 List of Bermuda Triangle incidents
 Template:Bermuda
 Tudor Hill Laboratory
 USN NAS Bermuda, Kindley Field, 1970-1995
 USN NAS Bermuda/NAS Annex, Morgans Point, 1941-1995
 U.S. Naval Facility Bermuda

Buildings and structures in Bermuda
 9 Beaches resort
 The Fairmont Hamilton Princess
 Royal Naval Dockyard, Bermuda

Bridges in Bermuda
 Somerset Bridge, Bermuda

Houses in Bermuda
 Ashley House (Paget Parish, Bermuda)

Official residences in Bermuda
 Government House, Bermuda

Communications in Bermuda
 Communications in Bermuda
.bm Internet country code top-level domain for Bermuda

Area codes in Bermuda
List of NANP area codes
 Area code 441

Bermudian media
 Bermuda Broadcasting

Television stations in Bermuda
 Bermuda Broadcasting
 List of television stations in Bermuda
 Template:Bermuda TV
 VSB-TV
 ZBM-TV
 ZFB-TV

Bermudian culture
 Culture of Bermuda
 Bermudian English
 Coat of arms of Bermuda
 Public holidays in Bermuda
 Victoria Park, Hamilton

Bermudian writers
Angela Barry
Brian Burland
Dale Butler
Mary Prince
Ira Philip
Elizabeth Mulderig
Eva Hodgson
Larry Burchall
Randolph Williams
Stewart Hayward

Bermudian songwriters

Bermudian singer-songwriters
Clinark (Clinarke Dill)
Collie budz aka Colin Harper
Eldon Raynor Jr
 Heather Nova
Hubert Smith

Economy of Bermuda
 Economy of Bermuda
 Bermuda Monetary Authority
 Bermuda Stock Exchange
Currency of Bermuda: Bermudian Dollar (formerly Bermudian pound)
ISO 4217: BMD

Companies of Bermuda

Banks of Bermuda
 The Bank of Bermuda

Companies listed on the Bermuda Stock Exchange
 ACE Ltd.
 HSBC

Insurance companies of Bermuda
 ACE Ltd.
 MS Frontier Reinsurance

Trade unions of Bermuda
 Bermuda Industrial Union
 Bermuda Public Services Association

Education in Bermuda
 Bermuda Biological Station for Research

Schools in Bermuda
Private Schools
 Bermuda High School for Girls
 Saltus Grammar School
 Somersfield Academy
 Bermuda Institute
 Warwick Academy
 Mount Saint Agnes Academy
Public Primary Schools
 East End Primary
 West Pembroke Primary
 Victor Scott
 Paget Primary
 Gilbert Institute
 Port Royal Primary
 Francis Patton Primary
 Dalton E. Tucker
 Somerset Primary
 West End Primary
 Purvis Primary
 St. David's Primary
 Prospect Primary
 Elliot Primary
 Harrington Sound Primary
 Heron Bay Primary 
 Northlands Primary
 St. Georges Preparatory
Public Middle Schools
 Clearwater Middle School
 Dellwood Middle School
 Sandys Secondary Middle School
 T.N. Tatem Middle School
 Whitney Institute Middle School

Religion in Bermuda
Anglican Church of Bermuda

Environment of Bermuda

Biota of Bermuda
 Flora and fauna in Bermuda

Flora of Bermuda

Conservation in Bermuda
 Bermuda National Trust

Natural history of Bermuda
 Bermuda petrel
 Bermuda rock skink
 Common ground dove
 Eastern bluebird
 Gray catbird
 Great kiskadee
 Mourning dove
 Northern cardinal
 White-eyed vireo
 White-tailed tropicbird
 Yellow-crowned night heron

Geography of Bermuda
 Geography of Bermuda
 Annie's Bay, Bermuda
 Bermuda Botanical Gardens
 Boaz Island, Bermuda
 Castle Harbor, Bermuda
 Castle Island, Bermuda
 Church Bay, Bermuda
 Coney Island, Bermuda
 Cooper's Island, Bermuda
 Crystal Cave, Bermuda
 Darrell's Island, Bermuda
 Devil's Hole, Bermuda
 Elbow Beach, Bermuda
 Ferry Reach, Bermuda
 Flatt's Inlet, Bermuda
 Flatts Village, Bermuda
 Great Sound, Bermuda
 Gunner Bay, Bermuda
 Hamilton Harbor, Bermuda
 Hamilton, Bermuda
 Harrington Sound, Bermuda
 Hawkins Island, Bermuda
 Hinson's Island, Bermuda
 Horseshoe Bay, Bermuda
 Ireland Island, Bermuda
 Islands of Bermuda
 Little Sound, Bermuda
 Long Island, Bermuda
 Mangrove Lake (Bermuda)
 Marshall's Island, Bermuda
 Nonsuch Island, Bermuda
 Ordnance Island, Bermuda
 Paget Island, Bermuda
 Places of interest in Bermuda
 Salt Kettle, Bermuda
 Smith's Island, Bermuda
 Somerset Island, Bermuda
 Somerset, Bermuda
 Spanish Point, Bermuda
 Spittal Pond, Bermuda
 St. David's Head, Bermuda
 St. David's Island, Bermuda
 St. George's Harbor, Bermuda
 St. George's Island, Bermuda
 St. George's, Bermuda
 The Causeway, Bermuda
 Tobacco Bay, Bermuda
 Trott's Pond (Bermuda)
 Trunk Island, Bermuda
 Tucker's Town Peninsula, Bermuda
 Tucker's Town, Bermuda
 Victoria Park, Hamilton
 Warwick Parish, Bermuda

Bermuda geography stubs
 Annie's Bay, Bermuda
 Bermuda Botanical Gardens
 Bermuda International Airport
 Castle Harbor, Bermuda
 Castle Island, Bermuda
 Church Bay, Bermuda
 Coney Island, Bermuda
 Cooper's Island, Bermuda
 Crystal Cave, Bermuda
 Devil's Hole, Bermuda
 Devonshire Parish, Bermuda
 Elbow Beach, Bermuda
 Ferry Reach, Bermuda
 Flatt's Inlet, Bermuda
 Flatts Village, Bermuda
 Great Sound, Bermuda
 Gunner Bay, Bermuda
 Hamilton Harbor, Bermuda
 Hamilton Parish, Bermuda
 Hamilton, Bermuda
 Harrington Sound, Bermuda
 Hawkins Island, Bermuda
 Hinson's Island, Bermuda
 Horseshoe Bay, Bermuda
 Ireland Island, Bermuda
 List of cities in Bermuda
 Little Sound, Bermuda
 Long Island, Bermuda
 Mangrove Lake (Bermuda)
 Marshall's Island, Bermuda
 Nonsuch Island, Bermuda
 Ordnance Island, Bermuda
 Paget Island, Bermuda
 Paget Parish, Bermuda
 Pembroke Parish, Bermuda
 Salt Kettle, Bermuda
 Sandys Parish, Bermuda
 Smith's Island, Bermuda
 Somerset Island, Bermuda
 Somerset, Bermuda
 Southampton Parish, Bermuda
 Spanish Point, Bermuda
 Spittal Pond, Bermuda
 St. David's Head, Bermuda
 St. David's Island, Bermuda
 St. George's Harbor, Bermuda
 St. George's Island, Bermuda
 Subdivisions of Bermuda
 Template:Bermuda-geo-stub
 The Causeway, Bermuda
 Tobacco Bay, Bermuda
 Trott's Pond, Bermuda
 Trunk Island, Bermuda
 Tucker's Town Peninsula, Bermuda
 Tucker's Town, Bermuda
 USCG Air-Sea Rescue, at USAF Base, Kindley Field
 USCG Base, Whites Island, Bermuda. WWI
 U.S. Naval Facility Bermuda
 Victoria Park, Hamilton
 Warwick Parish, Bermuda

Hurricanes in Bermuda
 Hurricane Debby (1982)
 Hurricane Emily (1987)
 Hurricane Dean (1989)
 Hurricane Felix (1995)
 Hurricane Karen (2001)
   Hurricane Fabian (2003
 Hurricane Florence (2006)
 Hurricane Igor (2010)

Maps of Bermuda
 Maps of Bermuda

Subdivisions of Bermuda
 Subdivisions of Bermuda
 Devonshire Parish, Bermuda
 Hamilton Parish, Bermuda
 Hamilton, Bermuda
 Paget Parish, Bermuda
 Pembroke Parish, Bermuda
 Sandys Parish, Bermuda
 Smith's Parish, Bermuda
 Southampton Parish, Bermuda
 St. George's Parish, Bermuda
 St. George's, Bermuda

Government of Bermuda
 Governor of Bermuda

History of Bermuda
 History of Bermuda
 Bermuda Admiralty Case
 Bermuda Militia 1612-1687
 Bermuda Militia 1687-1813
 Bermuda Militia 1813
 Bermuda Militias 1612-1815
 Hurricane Fabian
 Royal Air Force, Bermuda, 1939-1945
 Sea Venture
 George Somers
 Somers Isles Company
 Thomas Gates (governor)
 USN Submarine Base, Ordnance Island, Bermuda
 London Company

Elections in Bermuda
 Elections in Bermuda

National heroes
 Edgar F. Gordon
 Gladys Morrell
 Mary Prince
 Edward Richards
 Henry Tucker

Military of Bermuda
 Military of Bermuda
 Bermuda Militia 1612-1687
 Bermuda Militia 1687-1813
 Bermuda Militia 1813
 Bermuda Militia Artillery
 Bermuda Militias 1612-1815
 Bermuda Regiment
 Bermuda Sea Cadet Corps
 Bermuda Volunteer Rifle Corps
 Naval Air Station Bermuda
 RNAS Boaz Island
 Glyn Gilbert
 Royal Naval Dockyard, Bermuda
 USN Submarine Base, Ordnance Island, Bermuda

Bermudian people
 Kenneth Amis
 Lois Browne-Evans
 Peter Benchley
 Michael Douglas
 Edward Harris (archaeologist)
 Glyn Gilbert
 Thomas Norman Nisbett
 Thomas Leslie Outerbridge
 Mary Prince
 William Alexander Scott
 Jennifer M. Smith
 Gina Swainson
 John Swan

Bishops of Bermuda
Arthur Heber Browne
John Arthur Jagoe
Anthony Lewis Elliott Williams
John Armstrong
Eric Joseph Trapp
Robert Wright Stopford
Anselm Genders
Christopher Charles Luxmoore
William John Denbigh Down
Ewen Ratteray

Bermudian musicians

Bermudian guitarists

Bermudian female guitarists
 Heather Nova

Bermudian singers

Bermudian sportspeople

Bermudian athletes
 Troy Douglas
 Brian Wellman

Bermudian boxers
 Clarence Hill (boxer)

Bermudian cricketers
 Dennis Archer (cricketer)
 Delyone Borden
 Lionel Cann
 Hasan Durham
 Treadwell Gibbons
 Kevin Hurdle
 Dwayne Leverock
 Dean Minors
 Daniel Morgan (cricketer)
 Saleem Mukuddem
 George O'Brien (cricketer)
 Steven Outerbridge
 Azeem Pitcher
 Irving Romaine
 Clay Smith (cricketer)
 Ryan Steede
 Janeiro Tucker
 Kwame Tucker

Bermudian ODI cricketers
 List of Bermudian ODI cricketers
 Delyone Borden
 Lionel Cann
 Hasan Durham
 Treadwell Gibbons
 Kevin Hurdle
 Dwayne Leverock
 Dean Minors
 Daniel Morgan (cricketer)
 Saleem Mukuddem
 George O'Brien (cricketer)
 Steven Outerbridge
 Azeem Pitcher
 Irving Romaine
 Clay Smith (cricketer)
 Ryan Steede
 Janeiro Tucker
 Kwame Tucker

World Cup cricketers of Bermuda

Bermudian footballers
 David Bascome
 Clyde Best
 Shaun Goater
 Kyle Lightbourne
 John Barry Nusum
 Khano Smith

Olympic competitors for Bermuda
 Troy Douglas
 Clarence Hill (boxer)
 Brian Wellman

Bermudian triathletes
 Tyler Butterfield

Politics of Bermuda
 House of Assembly of Bermuda
 List of Premiers of Bermuda
 Parliament of Bermuda
 Politics of Bermuda
 Senate of Bermuda

Political parties in Bermuda
 List of political parties in Bermuda
 Progressive Labour Party (Bermuda)
 United Bermuda Party

Science and technology in Bermuda
 Bermuda Biological Station for Research

Sport in Bermuda
 Bermuda at the 1930 British Empire Games
 Bermuda at the 2006 Commonwealth Games

Football in Bermuda
 Bermuda Football Association
 Bermuda national football team

Bermudian football clubs
 Dandy Town Hornets F.C.

Bermudian football competitions
 Cingular Wireless Premier Division
 USL Second Division

Football venues in Bermuda
 Bermuda National Stadium

Bermuda at the Olympics
 Bermuda at the 1976 Summer Olympics
 Bermuda at the 1988 Summer Olympics
 Bermuda at the 2000 Summer Olympics
 Bermuda at the 2004 Summer Olympics
 Bermuda at the 2006 Winter Olympics

Transport in Bermuda
 Transport in Bermuda

Airports in Bermuda
 Bermuda International Airport

Nautical terms
Bermuda Fitted Dinghy
Bermuda rig
Bermuda sloop

See also

List of Bermuda-related topics
List of international rankings
Lists of country-related topics
Outline of geography
Outline of North America

References

External links